The Russian armoured train Yenisei is an armoured train currently in use by the Russia in their ongoing invasion of Ukraine in 2022. According to Ukrainian sources, Yenisei was constructed out of parts stolen from Ukrainian Railways in the Kharkiv region.

Specifications and Details
The train is protected by armoured plates of unknown thickness and is designed to transport materials, restore and demine tracks that are damaged, as well as for engineering reconnaissance. However, the train is also suspect for combat operations due to the presence of a ZU-23-2 and a mounted BMP-2, nevertheless, Russian sources dispute Yenisei's role as a combat vehicle, rather, claiming that the train is used for humanitarian purposes such as the delivery of water, medicines and food for civilians in Donbas, as well as evacuating over a thousand people from the combat zones.

The train is currently made up of at least two ChME3-type locomotives plus eight cars (two of which are platforms from the BMP-2 and ZU-23-2). On a whole, Yenisei is made up of two empty platform cars for cargo, logistical and construction purposes at the front and end of the train, a platform car mounting the BMP-2 as the 'head', followed by an anti-air car mounting the ZU-23-2 gun alongside an enclosed cabin with six machinegun slits, the first ChME3-type locomotive, a machinegun car with more gun slits, a freight car, another machinegun car and the second ChME3-type locomotive.

This is not the first armoured train used in the Russo-Ukrainian War, as a few other armoured trains were recorded transporting logistical and military goods through Crimea in March.

See also 
Armoured trains
List of armoured trains
2022 Russian invasion of Ukraine
Russo-Ukrainian War

References

Armoured trains
Railway weapons
Military equipment of the 2022 Russian invasion of Ukraine